Playing with Stars (Persian: ستاره‌بازی, romanized: Setareh Bazi) is a 2021 Iranian drama film directed and written by Hatef Alimardani. The film screened for the first time at the 39th Fajr Film Festival and earned 2 nominations.

Cast 

 Melisa Zakeri as Saba
 Farhad Aslani as Mahmoud
 Marshall Manesh as Khazaei
 Hasti Javadi
 Michael Madsen
 Ali Mosaffa
 Shabnam Moghaddami as Raheleh
 Kÿlla Lefrançois as Paramedic
 Marlos Moreira as Jacob
 Claudia Tiseo as Christina
 Sara Samani as Saba (English VO)
 John ford
 John Wheeler
 Hassan Sanati as Shahin
 Saman Aslani
 Seyyede Fatemeh Shahourani

Reception

Accolades

References

External links 
 

Iranian drama films
2020s Persian-language films